The 5th South Carolina Infantry Regiment (African Descent) was an infantry regiment  of African descent from South Carolina that failed to complete its organization to serve in the Union Army during the American Civil War. The enlisted men were transferred to the 3rd Regiment South Carolina Volunteer Infantry (African Descent) and the 4th Regiment South Carolina Volunteer Infantry (African Descent).

References

Bibliography 
 Dyer, Frederick H. (1959). A Compendium of the War of the Rebellion. New York and London. Thomas Yoseloff, Publisher. .

Units and formations of the Union Army from South Carolina
Military units and formations established in 1863
1863 establishments in South Carolina
Military units and formations disestablished in 1864